

Season 
During 1985–86 season, Lecce marked his Serie A debut with a draw against reigning champion Hellas Verona (2–2). Pugliese side had to face off an early relegation, suffering 19 losses in 30 games and finishing in last place (with 16 points). On April 20, with just a round left, Lecce managed to beat Roma by a 3–2 away: it resulted in Roma wasted the chance to clinch for title. In the following match, Lecce was defeated by Juventus who seized Scudetto.

Squad 

Goalkeepers 
 Stefano Ciucci
 Giordano Negretti
 Enrico Pionetti

Defenders 
 Giuseppe Colombo
 Luigi Danova
 Stefano Di Chiara
 Luigi Garzya
 Tommaso Logatto
 Carmelo Miceli
 Roberto Miggiano
 Salvatore Nobile
 Rodolfo Vanoli

Midfielders
 Juan Barbas
 Franco Causio
 Antonio Conte
 Giorgio Enzo
 Dario Levanto
 Claudio Luperto
 Maurizio Orlandi
 Marino Palese
 Maurizio Raise
 Roberto Rizzo

Attackers
 Alberto Di Chiara
 Alessandro Morello
 Ricardo Paciocco
 Pedro Pasculli

Manager
 Eugenio Fascetti

Competitions

Serie A

League table

Matches

Coppa Italia 

Group Phase-Group 2

References

Sources 
RSSF - Italy 1985/86

U.S. Lecce seasons
Lecce